The Campista River is a river of Rio de Janeiro state in southeastern Brazil.

See also
List of rivers of Rio de Janeiro

References
Brazilian Ministry of Transport

Rivers of Rio de Janeiro (state)